Christ the King Cathedral or Cathedral of Christ the King may refer to one of the following cathedrals:

Roman Catholic

Botswana
Christ the King Cathedral (Gaborone)

Brazil
Christ the King Cathedral, Belo Horizonte

Burundi
Christ the King Cathedral, Gitega

Canada
Cathedral Basilica of Christ the King, Hamilton, Ontario
Christ the King Cathedral, Gaspé, Quebec

India
Christ the King Cathedral, Balasore
Christ the King Co-Cathedral, Chandigarh
Christ the King Cathedral, Aizawl
Christ the King Cathedral, Kottayam
Kristuraja (Christ the King) Cathedral, Faridabad
Christ the King Cathedral, Marthandom

Iceland
Christ the King Cathedral (Reykjavík)

Ireland
Christ the King Cathedral, Mullingar in County Westmeath

Japan
Christ the King Cathedral, Niigata

Lithuania
Panevėžys Cathedral of Christ the King

Nigeria
Christ the King Cathedral, Aba

Poland
Cathedral of Christ the King, Katowice

Serbia
Co-cathedral of Christ the King in Belgrade

South Africa
Cathedral of Christ The King, Johannesburg

United Kingdom
Liverpool Metropolitan Cathedral of Christ the King, in Liverpool, England

United States
Cathedral of Christ the King (Atlanta), Georgia
Cathedral of Christ the King (Lexington, Kentucky)
Cathedral of Christ the King (Kalamazoo, Michigan)
Cathedral of Christ the King (Lubbock, Texas)
Cathedral of Christ the King (Superior, Wisconsin)

Vietnam
Christ the King Cathedral, Nha Trang

Anglican
Christ Church Cathedral in Grafton, Clarence Valley Council, New South Wales, Australia;
Christ the King Cathedral, Ballarat in Victoria, Australia;
Cathedral of Christ the King, Kurunegala in Sri Lanka;
Cathedral of Christ the King, Kalamazoo in Michigan, United States.

Other denominations
Christ the King Cathedral, Kottayam in India (Syro-Malabar Catholic)